Environmental toxicant may refer to:
Toxicant (a toxic substance) in the environment, whether biologically or artificially made
Environmental toxin, a biologically created toxicant in the environment
Environmental pollutant, an entity causing undesired effects in an environment

See also
Environmental toxicology
Environmental toxicants and fetal development